The 2025 UEFA Europa League Final will be the final match of the 2024–25 UEFA Europa League, the 54th season of Europe's secondary club football tournament organised by UEFA, and the 16th season since it was renamed from the UEFA Cup to the UEFA Europa League. The match will be played at San Mamés in Bilbao, Spain in May 2025.

The winners will earn the right to play against the winners of the 2024–25 UEFA Champions League in the 2025 UEFA Super Cup.

Venue

Host selection
On 16 July 2021, the UEFA Executive Committee announced that due to the loss of hosting rights for UEFA Euro 2020, San Mamés in Bilbao was given hosting rights for the 2025 final and the 2024 UEFA Women's Champions League Final. This was part of a settlement agreement by UEFA to recognise the efforts and financial investment made to host UEFA Euro 2020.

Match

Details
The "home" team (for administrative purposes) will be determined by an additional draw to be held after the quarter-final and semi-final draws.

See also
2025 UEFA Champions League Final
2025 UEFA Europa Conference League Final
2025 UEFA Women's Champions League Final

Notes

References

External links

2025
Final
Scheduled association football competitions
May 2025 sports events in Europe

Sport in Bilbao
International club association football competitions hosted by Spain